Group D of the 1999 Fed Cup Americas Zone Group II was one of two pools in the Americas Zone Group II of the 1999 Fed Cup. Four teams competed in a round robin competition, with the top two teams advancing to the knockout stage.

Peru vs. Antigua and Barbuda

Jamaica vs. Bermuda

Peru vs. Jamaica

Bermuda vs. Antigua and Barbuda

Peru vs. Bermuda

Jamaica vs. Antigua and Barbuda

See also
Fed Cup structure

References

External links
 Fed Cup website

1999 Fed Cup Americas Zone